Suffolk Public Schools is the branch of the government of the city of Suffolk, Virginia responsible for public K-12 education. Suffolk has multiple advanced/honors through its high schools, such as International Baccalaureate at King's Fork, Project Lead the Way Engineering at Nansemond River, and Project Lead the Way Biomedical at Lakeland.

The Superintendent of Schools is Dr. John B. Gordon III.  Assistant Superintendent of Curriculum and Instruction is Dr. LaToya Harrison and the Assistant Superintendent of Student Services is Dr. Suzanne Rice. 
The school system operates 12 elementary schools, five middle schools, three high schools, one alternative center and one College and Career Academy.

History

Schools

Elementary schools

 Booker T. Washington Elementary 
 Creekside Elementary
 Elephant's Fork Elementary
 Florence Bowser Elementary School
 Hillpoint Elementary 
 Kilby Shores Elementary
 Mack Benn, Jr. Elementary 
 Nansemond Parkway Elementary
 Northern Shores Elementary
 Oakland Elementary
 Pioneer Elementary

Middle schools

 Colonel Fred Cherry Middle School
 Forest Glen Middle School
 John F. Kennedy Middle School
 John Yeates Middle School   
 King's Fork Middle School

High schools

 King's Fork High School
 Lakeland High School
 Nansemond River High School

Alternative Center

 College & Career Academy At Pruden

 Turlington Woods Alternative School

Former schools

 Thomas Jefferson Elementary School (1911-1990)
 Booker T. Washington High School (1913-1969)
 Florence Bowser Elementary School (1920-2016)
 Suffolk High School (1922-1990)
 Chuckatuck High School (1924-1965)
 East Suffolk Elementary School (1929-1979)
 East Suffolk High School (1938-1965)
 Nansemond County Training School (1924-1964)
 Southwestern High School (1964-1970)
 Chuckatuck Junior High School (1965-1977)
 John F. Kennedy High School (1965-1990)
 John Yeates High School (1965-1990)
 Forest Glen High School (1965-1990)
 Southwestern Elementary School (1970-2014)
 Driver Elementary School (1968-2018)

References

External links

School divisions in Virginia
Education in Suffolk, Virginia